The Miss Virginia competition is a scholarship pageant for women, with the titleholder representing Virginia in the Miss America pageant. The competition was founded in 1953 as a scholarship contest for young women, although women had represented Virginia in the Miss America pageant since the 1930s. Four Miss Virginia winners have gone on to be crowned Miss America, including former national titleholder Caressa Cameron.

To compete in the Miss Virginia pageant, a contestant must first win one of many local competitions. Contestants may compete at the local and state level more than once, but having won a state title may only compete in the national Miss America competition one time. The state pageant was formerly held in Roanoke, Virginia at the Roanoke Civic Center in June or July, and moved to Liberty University in Lynchburg in June 2018.

During her reign, Miss Virginia travels over 40,000 miles across the state making appearances to further her social impact initiative, visit schools, and for the Miss America Organization's national Children's Miracle Network campaign.

Dorcas Campbell from Farfield was Miss Virginia of 1963, won many singing contests, and was a very talented opera singer. Kristi Lauren Glakas, Miss Virginia 2005, is one of only seven women who have competed in the Miss America, Miss Teen USA, and Miss USA competitions. She was Miss Virginia Teen USA 1999 and Miss Virginia USA 2004, placing in the top ten at Miss Teen USA 1999 and was a non-finalist at Miss USA 2004. Two other Miss Virginia titleholders later competed in the Miss USA pageant: Jennifer Pitts was Miss Virginia USA 2005 and Shannon DePuy was Miss Florida USA 1995.

Victoria Chuah of Ashburn was crowned Miss Virginia 2022 on June 25, 2022 at the Berglund Center Auditorium in Roanoke, Virginia. She competed at Miss America 2023 at the Mohegan Sun in Uncasville, Connecticut in December 2022 where she won the Women in STEM award.

Gallery of past titleholders

Results summary
The following is a visual summary of the past results of Miss Virginia titleholders at the national Miss America pageants/competitions. The year in parentheses indicates the year of the national competition during which a placement and/or award was garnered, not the year attached to the contestant's state title.

Placements
 Miss Americas: Kylene Barker (1979), Nicole Johnson (1999), Caressa Cameron (2010), Camille Schrier (2020)
 1st runners-up: Julianne Smith (1987), Cullen Johnson (1995), Courtney Garrett (2015)
 2nd runners-up: Anne Lee Ceglis (1954)
 3rd runners-up: Evangeline Glidewell (1933), Kristi Lauren Glakas (2006), Hannah Kiefer (2008) 
 4th runners-up: Rose Marie Elliott (1939), Nancy Glisson (1994)
 Top 10: Dorcas Campbell (1964), Cherie Davis (1969), Pamela Polk (1977), Heidi Lammi (1988), Shannon DePuy (1991), Nancy Redd (2004), Caitlin Uze (2011), Cecili Weber (2018)
 Top 15: Eleanor V. Reid (1926), Dolores Taylor (1936), Jacquelyn McWin (1941), Elizabeth Crot (2012), Savannah Lane (2016)
 Top 16: Frances L. Sultan (1937)

Awards

Preliminary awards
 Preliminary Lifestyle and Fitness: Linda Moyer (1972), Julianne Smith (1987), Cullen Johnson (1995), Nancy Redd (2004), Kristi Lauren Glakas (2006)
 Preliminary On Stage Interview: Emili McPhail (2019)
 Preliminary Talent: Anne Lee Ceglis (1954), Dorcas Campbell (1964), Cherie Davis (1969), Pamela Polk (1977), Crystal Lewis (2000), Caressa Cameron (2010), Camille Schrier (2020)

Non-finalist awards
 Non-finalist Talent: Rebecca Richardson (1957), Alice Sue Williams (1960), Patricia Gaulding (1963), Carolyn Eddy (1965), Sydney Lewis (1970), Terri Bartlett (1978), Susan Parker (1984), Tami Elliott (1990), Sheri Huffman (1991), Lora Flattum (1992), Michelle Kang (1997), Kelli Quick (1998), Crystal Lewis (2000)

Other awards
 Miss Congeniality: Linda Maclin (1967)
 Charles and Theresa Brown Scholarship: Hannah Kiefer (2008), Courtney Garrett (2015)
 Children's Champion Award: Nancy Redd (2004), Mariah Rice (2005)
 Quality of Life Award Finalists: Adrianna Sgarlata (2007), Tara Wheeler (2008), Caitlin Uze (2011), Courtney Garrett (2015)
 Waterford Crystal Business Scholarship: Cullen Johnson (1995)
 Women in STEM Winners: Victoria Chuah (2023)

Winners

Notes

References

External links
 Miss Virginia official website

Virginia
Virginia culture
Women in Virginia
Recurring events established in 1923
1923 establishments in Virginia
Annual events in Virginia